John Monson, 1st Baron Monson  (c. 169318 July 1748), known as Sir John Monson, 5th Baronet, from 1727 to 1728, was a British politician.

Life
He was the son of  George Monson of Broxbourne, Hertfordshire, and Anne, daughter of Charles Wren of the Isle of Ely. He matriculated from Christ Church, Oxford, on 26 January 1708. On 4 April 1722, he was returned to the House of Commons for the city of Lincoln, and was re-elected on 30 August 1727.

He was appointed a knight of the Bath on 17 June 1725, when that order was reconstituted by George I. He succeeded in the family baronetcy, in March 1727, on the death of his uncle Sir William. On 28 May of the following year he was created a peer, with the title of Baron Monson of Burton, Lincolnshire. In June 1733, Monson was named Captain of the Honourable Band of Gentlemen Pensioners, and in June 1737 was appointed first commissioner of trade and plantations. In this office, he was confirmed when the board was reconstituted in 1745, and he continued to hold it until his death. On 31 July 1737, he was made a privy councillor.

Monson died on 20 July 1748, and the Duke of Newcastle, in a letter to the Duke of Bedford, dated 12 August 1748, condoles with him upon "the loss of so valuable a man and so amiable a friend" Bedford in reply uses similar expressions of regret.

Family
He married Lady Margaret Watson, youngest daughter of Lewis Watson, 1st Earl of Rockingham, on S April 1725; they had three sons: John, 2nd baron Monson (see below) ; Lewis Thomas, who assumed the name of Watson, and was created Baron Sondes in 1760 ; and George Monson.

Notes

Attribution

References
Kidd, Charles, Williamson, David (editors). Debrett's Peerage and Baronetage (1990 edition). New York: St Martin's Press, 1990, 

Year of birth uncertain
1693 births
1748 deaths
17th-century English people
18th-century English nobility
18th-century English politicians
People from Broxbourne
Peers of Great Britain created by George II
Members of the Privy Council of Great Britain
Members of the Parliament of Great Britain for English constituencies
British MPs 1722–1727
Politics of Lincoln, England
Alumni of Christ Church, Oxford
Presidents of the Board of Trade
Knights Companion of the Order of the Bath
Honourable Corps of Gentlemen at Arms
John 01